Arnaldo Adolfo Sialle (born 21 November 1965) is a retired football defender who played in the Argentine Primera División and the Mexican Primera División and a football manager.

Career
Born in Rosario, Santa Fe, Sialle began playing professional football with Newell's Old Boys in the Primera División. He made 29 league appearances and scored two goals for the club from 1985 to 1989. In 1989, Sialle moved to Mexico where he played two seasons with Deportivo Irapuato. He would finish his playing career with Caracas F.C. in Venezuela.

After he retired from playing, Sialle began coaching football. He was an assistant to Belgrano de Córdoba manager Dalcio Giovagnoli during 2008 and 2009. Sialle also managed lower-division side Guillermo Brown de Puerto Madryn, leading the club to promotion from the Torneo Argentino A as the 2010–11 season champions. However, he resigned from the club after struggling in the Primera B Nacional September 2011. Soon after, he was appointed manager of Talleres de Córdoba in November 2011.

References

External links
 
 Arnaldo Sialle at BDFA.com.ar 

1965 births
Living people
Argentine footballers
Argentine expatriate footballers
Argentine Primera División players
Liga MX players
Newell's Old Boys footballers
Irapuato F.C. footballers
Caracas FC players
Expatriate footballers in Mexico
Expatriate footballers in Venezuela
Argentine football managers
Talleres de Córdoba managers
Association football defenders
Footballers from Rosario, Santa Fe